Lathuy is a village of Wallonia and a district of the municipality of Jodoigne, located in the province of Walloon Brabant, Belgium.

Jodoigne
Former municipalities of Walloon Brabant